Laurie N. Gottlieb is a Professor, School of Nursing, McGill University, Montreal, Quebec, Canada, where she holds the Flora Madeline Shaw Chair of Nursing. She is Editor-in-Chief of CJNR (Canadian Journal of Nursing Research) and was recently named Nurse-Scholar-in-Residence at the Jewish General Hospital, a McGill University teaching hospital.

Gottlieb has further developed, researched, lectured, and published extensively on the McGill Model of Nursing. With her husband, Bruce Gottlieb, PhD, a geneticist, they developed the Developmental/Health Framework, an important elaboration of the McGill Model of Nursing. Her books include: Strengths-Based Nursing Care: Health and Healing for Person and Family (in collaboration with Bruce Gottlieb, 2012; Springer Publishing Company), A Perspective on Health, Family, Learning and Collaborative Partnership (co-edited book on the early writings of the McGill Model of Nursing, Gottlieb & Ezer, 1997;McGill University), A Collaborative Partnership Approach to Care (Gottlieb & Feeley with Dalton, 2006; Mosby/Elsevier, with French and Japanese translations), and Dreams Have No Expiry Date: A Practical Way for Women to Take Charge of their Futures (Gottlieb & Rosenswig, 2005; Random House, with Spanish, Dutch, Korean and Portuguese translations). She has also developed the values and principles underlying Strengths-Based Leadership (see below the link) and Strengths-Based Teaching and Learning.

Awards and honours
She is the recipient of prestigious awards including the Centennial Award, the first and one-time only award from the Canadian Nurses Association recognizing the 100 most influential nurses in Canada; and, in 2009, the L'Insigne Du Merit, the highest recognition accorded to a nurse from the Order of Nurses of the Province of Quebec, and the Prix du Conseil Interprofessionnel du Québec (CIQ).

References

Living people
Canadian nurses
Canadian women nurses
Academic staff of McGill University
Canadian women non-fiction writers
Nursing educators
Nursing researchers
Year of birth missing (living people)
Canadian medical writers